Hindustani (Hindi: हिंदुस्तानी,) is one of the predominant languages of South Asia, with federal status in India and Pakistan in its standardized forms of Hindi and Urdu. It is widely spoken and understood as a second language in Nepal, Bangladesh, and the Persian Gulf and as such is considered a lingua franca in the Indian subcontinent. It is also one of the most widely spoken languages in the world by total number of speakers.
It developed in north India, principally during the Mughal Empire, when the Persian language exerted a strong influence on the Western Hindi languages of central India; this contact between the Hindu and Muslim cultures resulted in the core Indo-Aryan vocabulary of the Indian dialect of Hindi spoken in Delhi, whose earliest form is known as Old Hindi, being enriched with Persian loanwords. Rekhta, or "mixed" speech, which came to be known as Hindustani, Hindi, Hindavi, and Urdu (derived from Zabaan-i-Ordu by Mashafi meaning "language of the Horde".), also locally known as Lashkari or Lashkari Zaban in long form, was thus created. This form was elevated to the status of a literary language, and after the partition of colonial India and independence this collection of dialects became the basis for modern standard Hindi and Urdu. Although these official languages are distinct registers with regards to their formal aspects, such as modern technical vocabulary, they continue to be all but indistinguishable in their vernacular form.

Formation 
Most of the grammar and basic vocabulary of Hindustani descends directly from the medieval Indo-Aryan language of central India, known as Śauraseni. After the tenth century, several Śauraseni dialects were elevated to literary languages, including Braj Bhasha, Awadhi and the Khari Boli of Delhi.

During the reigns of the Turko-Afghan Delhi Sultanate and the Mughal Empire in India, where Persian was adopted as the official language and Delhi was established as the capital, the imperial court and concomitant immigration infused the Indo-Aryan dialect of Hindi spoken in Delhi (the earliest form is known as Old Hindi) with large numbers of Persian, Arabic, and Chagatai words from the court; this occurred as a result of cultural contact between Hindus and Muslims in Hindustan and became the fruit of a composite Ganga-Jamuni tehzeeb. The introduced words were primarily nouns and were employed for cultural, legal and political concepts. These Persian and Arabic loanwords form 25% of Urdu's vocabulary. As a form of Hindustani and a member of the Western Hindi category of Indo-Aryan languages, 75% of Urdu words have their etymological roots in Sanskrit and Prakrit, and approximately 99% of Urdu verbs have their roots in Sanskrit and Prakrit.

The new court language developed simultaneously in Delhi and Lucknow, the latter of which is in an Awadhi-speaking area; and thus, modern Hindustani has a noticeable Awadhi influence even though it is primarily based on Delhi dialect.  In these cities, the language continued to be called "Hindi" as well as "Urdu". While Urdu retained the grammar and core vocabulary of the local Hindi dialect, it adopted the Nastaleeq writing system from Persian.

The term Hindustani is derived from Hindustan, the Persian-origin name for the northwestern Indian subcontinent. The works of the 13th century scholar Amir Khusro are typical of the Hindustani language of the time:
 

सेज वो सूनी देख के रोवुँ मैं दिन रैन ।
पिया पिया मैं करत हूँ पहरों, पल भर सुख ना चैन ॥

sej vo sūnī dekh ke rovũ ma͠i din rain,
piyā piyā ma͠i karat hū̃ pahrõ, pal bhar sukh nā cain.

Seeing the empty bed I cry day and night
Calling for my beloved all day, not a moment of happiness or peace.

The language went by several names over the years: Hindavi ("of Hindus or Indians"), Dahlavi ("of Delhi"), Hindustani ("of Hindustan") and Hindi ("Indian"). The Mughal Emperor Shah Jahan built a new walled city in Delhi in 1639 that came to be known as Shahjahanabad. The market close to the royal fort (the Red Fort) was called Urdu Bazar ("Army/camp Market", from the Turkic word ordu, "army"), and it may be from this that the phrase Zaban-e-Urdu ("the language of the army/camp") derives. This was shortened to Urdu around the year 1800. The Mughal term Ordu with the local equivalent Lashkari or "camp language" (cognate with the English word, "horde"), was used to describe the common language of the Mughal army. The language spread from the interaction of Persian-speaking Muslim soldiers to the local people who spoke varieties of Hindi. Soon, the Persian script in the cursive Nasta'liq form was adopted, with additional letters to accommodate the Indian phonetic system. A large number of Persian words were adopted in Hindustani, as were even grammatical elements such as the enclitic ezāfe.

The official language of the Ghurids, Delhi Sultanate, the Mughal Empire, and their successor states, as well as their language of poetry and literature, was Persian, while the official language of religion was Arabic. Most of the sultans and the nobility of the sultanate period were Turkic peoples from Central Asia who spoke Chagatai as their mother tongue. The Mughals were also Chagatai, but later adopted Persian. The basis in general for the introduction of Persian language into the Indian subcontinent was set, from its earliest days, by various Persianized Central Asian Turkic and Afghan dynasties. Muzaffar Alam asserts that Persian became the lingua franca of the empire under Akbar for various political and social factors due to its non-sectarian and fluid nature. However, the armies, merchants, preachers, Sufis, and later the court, also incorporated the local people and elements of the medieval Hindu literary language, Braj Bhasha. This new contact language soon incorporated other dialects, such as Haryanvi, Panjabi, and in the 17th century the dialect of the new capital at Delhi. By 1800, Delhi dialect had become the dominant base of the language.

When Wali Mohammed Wali arrived in Delhi, he established Hindustani with a light smattering of Persian words, a register called Rekhta, for poetry; previously the language of poetry had been Persian. When the Delhi Sultanate expanded south to the Deccan Plateau, they carried their literary language with them, and it was influenced there by more southerly languages, producing the Dakhini dialect. During this time Hindustani was the language of both Hindus and Muslims. The non-communal nature of the language lasted until the British Raj in India, when in 1837 Hindustani in the Persian script (i.e. Urdu) replaced Persian as the official language and was made co-official along with English. This triggered a Hindu backlash in northwestern India, which argued that the language should be written in the native Devanagari script. This literary standard, called simply Hindi, replaced Urdu as the official register of Bihar in 1881, establishing a sectarian divide of "Urdu" for Muslims and "Hindi" for Hindus, a divide that was formalized with the independence of India and Pakistan after the withdrawal of the British.

Poetry 
The poet Wali Deccani (1667–1707) visited Delhi in 1700. His Rekhta or Hindavi ghazals established Hindustani as a medium of poetic expression in the imperial city. Hindustani soon gained distinction as the preferred language in courts of India and eventually replaced Persian among the nobles. To this day, Rekhta retains an important place in literary and cultural spheres. Many distinctly Persian forms of literature, such as ghazals and nazms, came to both influence and be affected by Indian culture, producing a distinct melding of Middle Eastern and South Asian heritages. A famous cross-over writer was Amir Khusro, whose Persian and Hindavi couplets are read to this day in the subcontinent. Persian has sometimes been termed an adopted classical language of South Asia alongside Sanskrit due to this role.

See also
Linguistic history of India
Hindustani etymology
List of Hindi-language authors
List of Urdu-language writers

References

External links
An introduction to the Hindustani language
History of Hindustani

Hindustani language
Indo-European language histories
Hindustani
Hindustani
Hindustani
Hindustani
Hindustani